The  is a third-sector railway company based in Kurashiki, Okayama, Japan. The company took over operation of three former Kurashiki City Transportation Bureau lines in 1970. It mainly transports freight for the industrial area around the Port of Mizushima, but also operates a passenger service on the Mizushima Main Line

Rolling stock
, the railway operates a fleet of 12 diesel railcars and three diesel locomotives.

Diesel multiple units
 KiHa 20 x1
 MRT300 x6
 KiHa 30 x1
 KiHa 37 x3
 KiHa 38 x1

In 2013, the company purchased six former KiHa 30, KiHa 37, and KiHa 38 diesel multiple unit (DMU) cars, which formerly operated on the JR East Kururi Line in Chiba Prefecture until they were withdrawn in December 2012. These entered service from 12 May 2014.

The KiHa 20 diesel car KiHa 205 is scheduled to be withdrawn following its last day in service on 19 March 2017.

Diesel locomotives

 Class DE70 x1 (DE70 1)
 Class DD500 x2 (DD501 and DD506)
 Class DD200

History

The 11.2 km  between Kurashiki-shi, Mitsubishi-jikō-mae, and Kurashiki Freight Terminal opened in 1943 to serve an aircraft factory. In 1947, the line was transferred to the city of Mizushima for industrial development, and a passenger service between Kurashiki and Mizushima commenced the following year.

The 3.6 km freight-only  between Mizushima and Higashi-Mizushima, and the 0.8 km freight-only  between Mitsubishi-Jikō-Mae and Nishi-Futō both opened in 1962.

CTC signalling was commissioned between Kurashiki and Mizushima in 1971, and the passenger service was extended to Mitsubishi-Jikō-Mae the following year.

See also
List of railway companies in Japan

References

External links 

  

Railway companies of Japan
Rail transport in Okayama Prefecture
Companies based in Okayama Prefecture
Japanese companies established in 1970